Anders Bengt Peter Andersson (born 29 August 1965) is a Swedish former professional ice hockey defenceman and former head coach of Brynäs IF in the Swedish Hockey League (SHL) from 2020 to 2021. In his National Hockey League career, he played for the New York Rangers and Florida Panthers. In Europe, he represented Färjestads BK, Düsseldorf EG and IF Malmö Redhawks.

Upon retiring in 2005, Andersson was named general manager of the Redhawks. He stayed as GM for three years before becoming an assistant coach and also head of scouting department for the team. From 2009 to 2013, he was the head coach of Örebro HK. From 2013 to 2016, he served as an assistant coach of Swiss club, HC Lugano of the National League A before returning to his native Sweden in accepting the head coaching role again with the Malmö Redhawks.

Andersson's son, Calle, was selected 119th overall by the New York Rangers in the 2012 NHL Entry Draft, and his other son Rasmus was selected 53rd by the Calgary Flames in the 2015 NHL draft.

For his achievements during the 2012–2013 ice hockey season, he was awarded Swedish Coach of the Year.

Career statistics

Regular season and playoffs

International

References

External links
 

1965 births
Düsseldorfer EG players
Färjestad BK players
Florida Panthers players
Ice hockey players at the 1992 Winter Olympics
Living people
HC Lugano players
Malmö Redhawks players
New York Rangers draft picks
New York Rangers players
Olympic ice hockey players of Sweden
Örebro HK players
Sportspeople from Örebro
Swedish expatriate ice hockey players in the United States
Swedish ice hockey defencemen
Swedish expatriate ice hockey players in Germany
Swedish expatriate sportspeople in Italy
Swedish expatriate sportspeople in Switzerland
Expatriate ice hockey players in Italy
Expatriate ice hockey players in Switzerland